Yorktown Center is a shopping mall located in the village of Lombard, a suburb of Chicago, Illinois, United States.  The mall's anchor stores are JCPenney, Marshalls, and Von Maur, with one vacant anchor store that was once Carson Pirie Scott. The Von Maur store is the second largest in the chain, the largest being at Perimeter Mall that opened in 2012 in Dunwoody, Georgia. The mall also features more than 100 other stores on its two levels. Other amenities include a food court and an outdoor concourse of shops known as The Shops on Butterfield.

At the time of its 1968 opening, the  Yorktown Center ranked as the largest shopping center in America. The mall was originally a four-anchor indoor mall - three-story Carson Pirie Scott and Wieboldt's anchor department stores faced each other across a central courtyard, while wings for two-story JCPenney and Montgomery Ward anchor department stores stretched northward and southward, respectively, from the center courtyard.    North of the mall proper, a strip mall dubbed the "Convenience Center" was constructed.  This was originally anchored by a Grand Union supermarket.  Other perimeter buildings included auto centers for the JCPenney and Montgomery Ward anchors, a General Cinema movie theater, and two restaurants.

One unusual feature is the Boeger-Brinkman Cemetery on the southern end of the parking lot, along Butterfield Road. The cemetery was part of a family's farmland that was sold to develop Yorktown Center. A small section of the cemetery remains while others were moved for the construction of the shopping center.  Since 2020, another new feature of the mall is that it is now considered the first dog-friendly mall in the entire state of Illinois.

History

1980s
A mid-1980s remodeling replaced the dark tile and flat white facades of the mall areas with pastels and neon lighting. Skylights were added to bring sunlight into the  shopping center. As part of this project, freestanding elevators were added to each wing, replacing the "floating" staircases. Later that same decade, a pair of escalators was added near the JCPenney and Montgomery Ward anchors, with additional retail space built under each pair of escalators. (Previous to these remodelings, there were no elevators in the mall proper, and only one pair of criss-crossed escalators at the center of the courtyard.)  The vacant supermarket anchor of the Convenience Center became a Scandinavian Design furniture store.

Unlike nearby Oakbrook Center - which would add to its anchor collection three times in twenty years - the middle-market Yorktown Center would lose multiple anchors over the same span. Wieboldt's was the first anchor store to close, shuttered at the bankruptcy of the chain in 1987; the anchor lay vacant for seven years, until Von Maur remodeled the anchor and opened it as their first Chicago-area store in 1994.

1990s
Madigan's, a two-level clothing store near JCPenney, closed in 1992. This space remained unoccupied until it was rebuilt as a food court upstairs and retail space downstairs. The original Madigan's escalator remains in the middle of the foodcourt.

When Woolworth's closed in 1997, it remained empty until Big Idea Productions, an animation studio known for its VeggieTales series, took over the space in 1999.  Big Idea had originally planned to use the space as temporary offices as they rebuilt and expanded the local DuPage Theater into a new corporate headquarters, but when that space required more work than they expected, they donated the theater to the village and stayed in Yorktown.  When Big Idea Productions relocated to Franklin, Tennessee in July 2004, the company vacated their mall space, which was eventually converted to Steve and Barry's. 

Meanwhile, the perimeter of the mall became the site of further development, featuring a Target Greatland which opened in October 1996. The JCPenney Auto Center would be redeveloped into The Pacific Club, a nightclub managed by Chicago football icon Walter Payton's restaurant group. The General Cinema movie theater would be torn down and replaced with an eighteen-screen megaplex with screens for dine-in movies. Despite a remodeling, the Convenience Center lost several prominent tenants, including an Ace Hardware store. However, the anchor space - vacant after the closure of the Scandinavian Design chain - was acquired by Carson Pirie Scott to serve as the new location for their furniture department.

2000s
At the beginning of the decade, a major remodeling of the central courtyard took place. The narrow, linear bridge between the north and south sides of the courtyard was demolished, along with its pair of escalators. In its place, a wide diagonal bridge was built, with two pairs of escalators.  As part of the project, a customer service desk was built near the north-side escalator; the mall had no such desk prior to this time.

Montgomery Ward was the second anchor to fall, closing as the chain liquidated in 2001. After a short stint as Magellan's Furniture, and failure to attract another anchor store, it was demolished for a lifestyle center section known as "The Shops on Butterfield". This new section, anchored by HomeGoods, Marshalls, and Lucky Strike Lanes (a bowling alley), opened in 2007. The former Montgomery Ward Auto Center was replaced by a Claim Jumper restaurant. That same year, an eighteen-story Westin hotel opened outside the mall. At the same time, the Convenience Center was renamed "The Shops at Yorktown"; despite the popularity of the Carson Pirie Scott furniture gallery, which added on an expansion, it continued to exhibit a high rate of vacancies.

2010s
In April 2012, Yorktown Center was bought by a partnership between KKR and YTC Pacific for $196 million.

In 2014, Yorktown Center management spent $18 million dollars renovating the food court by adding more healthy options. Upgrades in the food court added 200 seats, entertainment screens, work stations for shoppers to plug in laptops, and a family lounge.

In April 2018, the mall announced that Carson Pirie Scott - then known as Carson's - would close by August, leaving only Von Maur and JCPenney as anchor stores. Following the associated closure of the Carson's furniture gallery, the largely vacant Shops of Yorktown was slated for demolition, with the space to be redeveloped as apartment buildings.

In 2019, as part of a redevelopment effort by Lombard, the luxury apartments on the northside of the center, Elan and Overture were completed and opened. The property is managed and owned by Greystar.

2020s

In November 2020, Pacman Zone was founded.

In 2021, Lombard approved the construction of an Olive Garden on the south side of the center. The construction is underway and set to open in 2023. 

In 2022, D.R. Horton sought to acquire a portion of the vacant strip mall on the north side of the center. The Village Board approved the project and economic incentive on October 20, 2022. D.R. Horton acquired the property in early 2023 and construction is underway for 90 townhomes to be called The Summit at Yorktown.

Sales tax rate
The sales tax rate for Lombard is 8%. However, an additional 1 percent is added to the sales tax in the Business Improvement District, which includes the new development on the site of the old Montgomery Wards store and a portion of the southwest wing of Yorktown (i.e., the region of Yorktown Mall which includes The Shops on Butterfield).  Additionally, restaurants in the Yorktown area that offer sit-down dining are subject to an additional 1 percent Places for Eating Tax; this mainly involves the outlets along Highland Avenue and Butterfield Road.

Bus routes 
Pace

  313 St. Charles Road  
  322 Cermak Road/22nd Street  
  715 Central Dupage   
  722 Ogden Avenue  
  834 Joliet/Downers Grove

References

External links
Official website

Shopping malls in DuPage County, Illinois
Shopping malls established in 1968
Lombard, Illinois
1968 establishments in Illinois